The following is a list of squads for all 10 national teams that competed at the 2020 South American Under-20 Women's Football Championship. Each national team had to submit a final squad of 22 players, 3 of whom had to be goalkeepers.

Group A

Argentina
Head Coach:Carlos Borrello

The 22-player squad was announced on 23 February 2020.

Bolivia

Venezuela

Colombia
Head Coach:Nelson Abadía

The 22-player squad was announced on 18 February 2020.

Ecuador
Head coach:  Emily Lima

Group B

Brazil
Head Coach:Jonas Urias

The 22-player squad was announced on 18 February 2020.

Paraguay
Head Coach: Epifania Benítez

The 22-player squad was announced on 21 February 2020.

References

South American U-20 Women's Championship